Phil Small is an Australian media personality.

He started his career as a commercial radio announcer and producer.

Joining WIN News Canberra in 1989 as a general news reporter, he later became the station's sports presenter and reporter, and held the position for twenty years.

Small also hosted WIN programs League Round Up and Sports Arena in past years, and was a close friend to former WIN News presenter, Peter Leonard - reading the eulogy at his funeral.

In early June 2009, Small announced he was leaving WIN, accepting a job within the Australian Federal Police's communications department. His final bulletin was on Friday 26 July 2009.

Maintaining his regular involvement as 1206 2CC's NRL commentator and Thoroughbred Park's raceday host, Small has also commentated for Rugby Union, Basketball and Gridiron for both radio and television. He also contributes to a number of local charities.

Phil Small is married to wife Judy, and has two children.

References

External links 
 WIN Television: profile

Australian television journalists
Living people
Year of birth missing (living people)